Group B of the 2013 Fed Cup Americas Zone Group II was one of two pools in the Americas zone of the 2013 Fed Cup. Five teams competed in a round robin competition, with the teams proceeding to their respective sections of the play-offs: the top team played for advancement to the 2014 Group I.

Standings

Round-robin

Bahamas vs. Trinidad and Tobago

Uruguay vs. El Salvador

Dominican Republic vs. Costa Rica

Bahamas vs. Uruguay

Dominican Republic vs. El Salvador

Costa Rica vs. Trinidad and Tobago

Bahamas vs. Costa Rica

Uruguay vs. Dominican Republic

El Salvador vs. Trinidad and Tobago

Bahamas vs. El Salvador

Uruguay vs. Costa Rica

Dominican Republic vs. Trinidad and Tobago

Bahamas vs. Dominican Republic

Uruguay vs. Trinidad and Tobago

Costa Rica vs. El Salvador

See also 
 Fed Cup structure

References

External links 
 Fed Cup website

2013 Fed Cup Americas Zone